Nordberg Church is a hexagonal church, located in the neighbourhood of Nordberg in Oslo, Norway. 

The church was completed in 1962 and was restored and expanded with a church parlor in 1982. The facade is in white bricks and has a characteristic church tower which can be seen from large parts of the city of Oslo. It is one of the largest churches in the city.

The altar tapestry, The Resurrection, was made by Kari-Bjørg Ile. It came into place in 1992. The pulpit and the baptismal font are made according to the architects' drawings. The current church organ from 2015 is a digital organ of the type Johannus Monarke Präludium.

There are two church bells from Olsen Nauen Bell Foundry in the church tower.

Outside the church is a log house, a former chapel used for the church's nursery.

The church is listed by the Norwegian Directorate for Cultural Heritage and protected by Norwegian law.

References

External links 
Official parish website (in Norwegian)

Lutheran churches in Oslo
Churches completed in 1962
1962 establishments in Norway
20th-century Church of Norway church buildings
Hexagonal churches in Norway